John Barrie Skilbeck Hutchinson (19 June 1926 – 14 February 2019) was a New Zealand rugby union and water polo player.

At the 1950 British Empire Games he won the silver medal as part of the men's water polo team.

As well as playing water polo he was involved in rugby. He played for and captained the Wellington and Auckland rugby teams, as well as playing in All Blacks trial teams. He was also a rugby coach and served as president of the Auckland Rugby Football Union.

He spent six years as an Auckland City Councillor, and worked in real estate. At the 1978 general election, Hutchinson unsuccessfully contested the Onehunga electorate for the National Party, losing to the incumbent Labour MP, Frank Rogers, by 1417 votes.

Hutchinson died on 14 February 2019.

References

1926 births
2019 deaths
Commonwealth Games silver medallists for New Zealand
New Zealand male water polo players
New Zealand rugby union players
Water polo players at the 1950 British Empire Games
Auckland City Councillors
New Zealand sportsperson-politicians
Auckland rugby union players
Wellington rugby union players
Unsuccessful candidates in the 1978 New Zealand general election
New Zealand National Party politicians
Commonwealth Games competitors for New Zealand